Dragon Rapide may refer to:

 De Havilland Dragon Rapide, 1930s short-haul biplane airliner
 Dragon Rapide (film), 1986 Spanish historical drama film